is a Japanese actress and voice actress. She is well known for her role as Mayumi Sasaki in Carved.

Filmography

Movies
Returner (2002)
Love My Life (2006)
The Midnight Girls (2006)
LoveDeath (2007)
Carved (film) (2007)
Hey Japanese! Do You Believe Peace, Love and Understanding (2008)
Mutant Girls Squad (2010)
The Killer (2010) - Short Film

TV drama
Shin Megami Tensei
Furuhata Ninzaburō

External links

1973 births
Living people
Japanese voice actresses
Voice actors from Hakodate
Voice actresses from Hokkaido